Nordic Semiconductor is a Norwegian fabless technology company specializing in designing ultra-low-power wireless communication semiconductors and supporting software for engineers developing and manufacturing IoT (Internet of Things) products.

The company's primary SoC and SiP hardware products support wireless technologies, protocols, and standards like Bluetooth LE and BLE mesh, Wi-Fi,  Thread, Zigbee, Matter,  LTE-M and NB-IoT, as well as proprietary 5G DECT NR+ and 2.4  GHz ISM band communication. nRF Connect SDK (software development kit) integrates Zephyr RTOS and lets developers build size-optimized software.

End-user applications and products include consumer electronics; wireless headphones and LE audio gear; wireless mobile phone accessories ("Appcessories"); wireless gamepad, mouse, and keyboard; intelligent sports equipment; wireless medical; remote control; wireless voice-audio applications (e.g., voice over IP); security; wireless navigation hardware; and toys. In addition, industrial and commercial IoT applications include health, asset tracking, metering (gas/water/electricity), smart home and building automation.

Nordic Semiconductor has been ISO 9001 certified by Det Norske Veritas (DNV) since 1996, and the certificate was upgraded to ISO 9001-2000 in 2001. In 1996, Nordic Semiconductor was listed on the Oslo Stock Exchange's SME list.

Nordic Semiconductor (originally named Nordic VLSI) was founded in 1983 and is headquartered in Trondheim, Norway.

History

Nordic Semiconductor was initially founded as Nordic VLSI (NVLSI) in Trondheim, Norway, in 1983. Four post-graduates formed the company from the Norwegian University of Science and Technology. Initially, the company focused on the design of mixed-signal application-specific integrated circuits (ASICs) within the Nordic region. In 1996, the firm went public on the Norwegian stock exchange, where it still trades . 

In 1998, NVLSI released its first wireless standard products in the 433 MHz ISM band. In 2003 NVLSI was renamed Nordic Semiconductor, often known as Nordic Semi, to reflect the company's focus on ultra-low-power wireless devices. The same year saw the release of Nordic Semiconductor's first wireless devices at 2.4 GHz. Since 2003, Nordic Semiconductor has maintained a clear focus on wireless products for the 2.4 GHz band and has seen its devices used in a wide range of branded consumer electronic products. Nordic Semiconductor maintains its dominant position in the wireless sports, fitness, and desktop peripheral markets.

Nordic Semiconductor products support short-range low-power wireless through Bluetooth LE, Thread, Zigbee, and proprietary 2.4 GHz protocols; and low-power cellular IoT through LTE-M and NB-IoT.

2012 saw the release of the third generation of ultra-low-power wireless products. This family of products is named the nRF51 series, and incorporates the ARM Cortex-M series microcontrollers at their core.

In 2015 Nordic Semiconductor introduced new 2.4 GHz ISM band SoC series, the nRF52 Series with ARM Cortex-M4 as their core.

In January 2018, Nordic Semiconductor introduced its first cellular product, the nRF91 series. With the nRF9160 system in a package (SiP), the company expanded from Bluetooth LE and short-range radio applications into cellular network solutions.  The main focus is on cellular IoT by supporting LTE-M and NB-IoT.

In November 2019, Nordic Semiconductor introduced a flagship SoC containing dual-core ARM Cortex-M33 processors and a multi-protocol radio stack (NFC/BLE/BLE mesh/Zigbee/Thread/others), the nRF53 series.

In 2022, Nordic Semiconductor unveiled a low-power, dual-band Wi-Fi 6 companion chip, the nRF70 Series. ICs compatible with the nRF7002 include the nRF52 and nRF53 Bluetooth SoCs and the nRF91 cellular SiP, although Nordic claims that the device can also be used with non-Nordic host devices.

Products
Nordic Semiconductor designs and produces SoC, SiP, and connectivity solutions for the ISM bands at 5 GHz, 2.4 GHz and 868/915 MHz bands. The products operate on low power, enabling wireless and IoT applications to use little battery and run on harvested energy. 

Current products include SoCs incorporating the ARM Cortex-M0, ARM Cortex-M4 and ARM Cortex-M33 microcontroller cores.

Popular products include the nRF24L01+ and the nRF24LE1, both using the lightweight and proprietary "Enhanced ShockBurst" protocol stack in 2.4 GHz ISM band. The nRF24L01+ is a simple transceiver with some logic to implement the protocol stack and is connected to a microcontroller via an SPI bus, while the nRF24LE1 can be seen as an nRF24L01 and a microcontroller in the same chip.'

Cellular IoT

nRF91 Series SiP 
The nRF9160 SiP expanded Nordic Semiconductor's lineup from mainly focusing on Bluetooth LE and other short range wireless protocol SoCs into the realm of connected devices using the cellular network for internet connectivity. The series offers LTE-M and NB-IoT connectivity.

Wi-Fi

nRF70 Series 
A Wi-Fi companion IC is designed to provide Wi-Fi connectivity and functionality to existing Nordic products. Unlike other Nordic solutions, the first product, nRF7002, is strictly for connectivity.

Multi-protocol

nRF53 Series SoC 
The nRF5340 SoC is the world's first dual-core ARM Cortex-M33 SoC (128MHz + 64MHz), released in 2020. This is Nordic's new generation of wireless SoCs with a separate processor core to handle connectivity, thus freeing up resources for handling more demanding applications on the main processor's core without compromising on the connectivity.

nRF52 Series SoCs 

The nRF52 Series SoCs was the second short-range wireless SoCs from Nordic Semiconductor, building on their experience developing the nRF51 Series. The nRF52 series, especially the nRF52840 and nRF52833, is very successful and exists in millions of popular consumer devices in the world today, among them wireless mice, keyboards and audio devices. The popularity of Nordic's nRF52 series allows Nordic Semiconductor to maintain a 40% worldwide market share in the Bluetooth LE segment.

The nRF52833 SoC features a 64 MHz ARM Cortex-M4. This SoC supports an extended temperature range of -40˚C to 105˚C. The SoC has a 1:4 RAM to Flash storage ratio (128 KB : 512 KB). Being a wireless-focused chip, the nRF52833 is equipped with an output power of +8 dBm.

nRF51 Series SoCs 
The nRF51 Series SoCs was the first short-range wireless SoC series from Nordic Semiconductor; it was superseded by the nRF52 Series SoCs.

Power Management (nPM) 
Dedicated Power Management ICs (PMIC) can achieve better performance and efficiency, and handle higher load capacities than smaller manufacturing processes and internal regulators. nPM Series supports power management and battery charging.

Range Extenders (nRF21) 
The transmit (TX) output power and the receiver sensitivity directly influence the link budget of a connection. An RF front-end module (FEM) increases the range at which two wireless devices can communicate while enhancing link robustness. nRF21540 RF FEM can boost wireless range up to 10x.

Cloud Services 
nRF Cloud is a platform for cloud services for the nRF Series of wireless devices.

Development Software 
nRF Connect SDK is a software development kit for the nRF Series of wireless devices.

Wireless Technologies and Protocols

Nordic Semiconductor provides hardware and software for several wireless technologies and protocols.

 Cellular IoT (LTE-M/NB-IoT)
 Internet of Things (IoT) devices use existing cellular networks, such as those used for mobile phones, to communicate over long distances and through walls and other barriers with greater flexibility and coverage than other wireless communication technologies.
 DECT NR+
 DECT Next Generation is an evolution of the DECT standard that allows any company or organization to build its own private 5G network and run and optimize as they wish.
 Wi-Fi
 By maximizing Wi-Fi’s low-power potential, Wi-Fi can be introduced in applications such as sensor networks, smart speakers, security cameras, home appliances, robot vacuums, and more.
 Bluetooth Low Energy
 Bluetooth Low Energy (BLE) is a wireless personal area network technology designed for use with low-power devices.
 Bluetooth LE Audio
 A new Bluetooth audio standard designed to reduce power consumption and improve the performance and functionality of Bluetooth audio devices such as wireless headphones and speakers. 
 Bluetooth Direction Finding
 Bluetooth Mesh
 Matter for smart home applications
 Matter uses Thread, Wi-Fi, Ethernet and Bluetooth LE to make it possible for developers to create secure and interoperable products for the major smart home ecosystems.
 Thread
 Zigbee
 ANT+
 2.4 GHz proprietary
 Amazon Sidewalk
 Apple Find My network

Industry associations
Nordic Semiconductor is a member of the ANT+ Alliance, Bluetooth Special Interest Group, Thread Group, Connectivity Standards Alliance, Wi-Fi Alliance, GSMA, and the Zephyr Project .

Clones 
Some clones of Nordic Semiconductor's chips can be found on the market, such as the SI24R1 and the BK2421. They often demonstrate inferior receiver sensitivity and higher power consumption, although they may add additional features such as higher maximal transmission power.

Locations
Nordic Semiconductor is headquartered in Trondheim, Norway.
R&D offices are located in Portland (US), Krakow and Wrocław (Poland), Oulu, Espoo, Tampere and Turku (Finland), Hyderabad (India), Bristol and Hertfordshire (UK), Stockholm and Lund (Sweden), and in Oslo and Trondheim (Norway).
Technical support or sales offices are located in Oslo (Norway), San Diego (US), Beijing, Shanghai, Shenzhen and Hong Kong (China), Taipei (Taiwan), Manila (the Philippines), Yokohama (Japan), Seoul (South Korea), Düsseldorf (Germany), Eindhoven (the Netherlands) and London (UK).

References

External links
 
 
 

Companies based in Trondheim
Semiconductor companies of Norway
Fabless semiconductor companies
Companies established in 1983
Companies listed on the Oslo Stock Exchange
Norwegian brands
Norwegian companies established in 1983